The 2022 South and Central American Men's Handball Championship was the second edition of the South and Central American Men's Handball Championship, held from 25 to 29 January 2022 in Recife, Brazil. It acted as the South and Central American qualifying tournament for the 2023 World Men's Handball Championship.

Brazil won their first title after defeating Argentina in the final.

Qualified teams

Colombia withdrew before the tournament, due to several positive COVID-19 tests in their team.

Note: Bold indicates champion for that year. Italic indicates host for that year.

Draw
The draw took place on 14 January 2022.

Seeding

Preliminary round
All times are local (UTC−3).

Group A

Group B

Knockout stage

Bracket

5–7th place semifinal

Semifinals

Fifth place game

Third place game

Final

Final standings

All-star team
The all-star team was announced on 31 January 2022.

Top goalscorers

Source:

References

External links
Website

South and Central American Men's Handball Championship
South and Central American Men's Handball Championship
South and Central American Men's Handball Championship
South and Central American Men's Handball Championship
South and Central American Men's Handball Championship